Jane Geddes (born February 5, 1960) is a retired American professional golfer. She joined the LPGA Tour in 1983 and won two major championships and 11 LPGA Tour events overall. Geddes was the Vice President of Talent Relations of WWE.

Career
Geddes was born in Huntington, New York. She played college golf at Florida State University and was a member of the school's national championship team in 1981.  She joined the LPGA Tour in 1983, posting runner-up finishes three times from 1984 to 1985.

Geddes broke through for her first professional victory when she won the 1986 U.S. Women's Open by defeating Sally Little in an 18-hole playoff. Then she won again the very next week. The year 1987 was her best, as she posted five victories, including the Mazda LPGA Championship, and four second-place finishes, finishing third on the money list. In all, seven of Geddes' 11 career wins came from 1986 to 1987.

Geddes won twice in 1991 and her last win was at the 1994 Chicago Challenge. Geddes finished in the Top 20 on the money list nine times, and posted 14 Top 10 finishes in majors in addition to her two major championship wins. In 2000, she was recognized during the LPGA's 50th Anniversary in 2000 as one of the LPGA's top-50 players and teachers. She retired from the LPGA Tour following the 2003 season.

Geddes co-founded an Internet e-commerce company named Planesia, which she sold in 2001. She received a degree in criminology from the University of South Florida in 2003, and later received a law degree from Stetson University College of Law in Florida. She also served as assistant captain of the U.S. Solheim Cup team in 2002 and 2003. In January 2007, she joined the LPGA Tour as Senior Director of Tournament Business Affairs.  She was later promoted to Vice-President of Competition. In 2009, she was promoted again to Senior Vice President of Tournament Operations and Players Services.

In September 2011, Geddes left the LPGA to become VP of Talent Relations for World Wrestling Entertainment. On March 4, 2015, it was reported that Geddes had parted ways with the WWE.

In April 2017, Geddes was named CEO of Executive Women's Golf Association (EWGA), a Florida not-for-profit corporation whose mission is to connect women to learn, play and enjoy golf for business and for fun. The EWGA was acquired by the LPGA and she became the Executive Director of the LPGA Amateur Golf Association.

From 2016 to 2019 she served as the Executive Director of the International Association of Golf Administrators.

In 2019 she left both positions in the LPGA Amateur Golf Association and International Association of Golf Administrators.

Personal life
She currently resides near Stamford, Connecticut, with her partner, former professional tennis player Gigi Fernández, and their twins, Karson Xavier and Madison Jane.

Professional wins (15)

LPGA Tour (11)

LPGA Tour playoff record (3–2)

Ladies European Tour (1)
1989 Weetabix Women's British Open

LPGA of Japan Tour (1)
1987 Treasure Invitational

ALPG Tour (2)
1990 Daikyo Australian Ladies Masters
1991 Daikyo Australian Ladies Masters

Major championships

Wins (2)

1 In an 18-hole playoff, Geddes 71, Little 73.

Team appearances
Professional
Solheim Cup (representing the United States): 1996 (winners)
Handa Cup (representing the United States): 2006 (winners)

See also
List of golfers with most LPGA Tour wins
List of golfers with most LPGA major championship wins

References

External links

American female golfers
Florida State Seminoles women's golfers
LPGA Tour golfers
Winners of LPGA major golf championships
Solheim Cup competitors for the United States
Golfers from New York (state)
Golfers from Florida
Lesbian sportswomen
LGBT golfers
LGBT people from New York (state)
LGBT people from Florida
American LGBT sportspeople
WWE executives
Stetson University College of Law alumni
People from Huntington, New York
People from Seminole County, Florida
Sportspeople from Stamford, Connecticut
1960 births
Living people